This is a list of Dutch television related events from 1990.

Events
10 March - Maywood are selected to represent Netherlands at the 1990 Eurovision Song Contest with their song "Ik wil alles met je delen". They are selected to be the thirty-fourth Dutch Eurovision entry during Nationaal Songfestival held at Congresgebouw in The Hague.
Unknown - Marco Borsato wins the sixth series of Soundmixshow, performing as Billy Vera. This was the first series to be broadcast on RTL 4.

Debuts

Domestic
1 October - Goede tijden, slechte tijden (1990–present)

International
27 May -  Fireman Sam (VARA)

Television shows

1950s
NOS Journaal (1956–present)

1970s
Sesamstraat (1976–present)

1980s
Jeugdjournaal (1981–present)
Soundmixshow (1985-2002)
Het Klokhuis (1988–present)

Ending this year

Births
10 September - Liza Sips, actress, voice actress & TV presenter

Deaths